Tristan Enaruna (born 26 June 2001) is a Dutch college basketball player for the Cleveland State Vikings of the Horizon League. He previously played for the Kansas Jayhawks and the Iowa State Cyclones.

Early career
Born in Almere, Enaruna started playing junior basketball with Almere Pioneers. He later played for the youth academy of Apollo Amsterdam.

In the 2017–18 season, Enaruna made his debut with Apollo Amsterdam in the professional Dutch Basketball League (DBL) at age 16. He received a place on the roster, along with his brother Iyen. On July 10, 2017, Enaruna played his first professional game, playing 7 minutes in a 82–80 win over Rotterdam. Over the season, he played in three games and averaged 12 minutes and 2.7 points.

High school career
In the 2018–19 season, Enaruna played with Wasatch Academy in the United States.

College career
In May 2019, Enaruna committed to play collegiately for Kansas.

On 19 April 2021, Enaruna transferred to Iowa State. He scored a career-high 23 points on January 1, 2022, in a 77-72 loss to Baylor.

Career statistics

College

|-
| style="text-align:left;"| 2019–20
| style="text-align:left;"| Kansas
| 30 || 0 || 10.9 || .342 || .258 || .500 || 2.2 || .6 || .5 || .3 || 2.4
|-
| style="text-align:left;"| 2020–21
| style="text-align:left;"| Kansas
| 25 || 0 || 9.4 || .415 || .227 || .667 || 1.6 || .3 || .4 || .2 || 2.8
|- class="sortbottom"
| style="text-align:center;" colspan="2"| Career
|| 55 || 0 || 10.2 || .376 || .245 || .575 || 1.9 || .5 || .4 || .3 || 2.6

Personal
Enaruna has an older brother, Iyen, who also plays college basketball for the Evansville Purple Aces.

References

External links
Iowa State Cyclones bio
Kansas Jayhawks bio

2001 births
Living people
Apollo Amsterdam players
Dutch Basketball League players
Dutch expatriate basketball people in the United States
Dutch men's basketball players
Iowa State Cyclones men's basketball players
Kansas Jayhawks men's basketball players
Shooting guards
Small forwards
Sportspeople from Almere